Perigosas Peruas is a Brazilian telenovela produced and displayed at the time of 19 hours by TV Globo, February 10 to August 28, 1992, in 173 chapters. Substitute Vamp and be succeeded by Deus Nos Acuda.

Written by Carlos Lombardi, with text supervision of Lauro César Muniz and general direction of Roberto Talma.

Synopsis 
Friends from their childhood, Cidinha and Leda followed opposite paths: the former became a housewife who never thought of working outside, and the latter became a successful professional with aversion to marriage and children. In common, just a love of the past: Belo, son of the Italian Dona Gemma, who eventually married Cidinha.

What Cidinha does not know is that, during her pregnancy, Leda also expected a baby from Belo and that, with the premature death of Cidinha's baby, Belo had changed the babies in the maternity ward.

Back in Brazil after years of professional success abroad, Leda will claim custody of her daughter with Cidinha. But Belo works for the Torremolinos, a powerful family of the Mafia, headed by the cousins Franco and Branco. And they involve Belo in a big mess: either he kills Leda and Cidinha, or they kill him.

Cast

References

External links
 

1992 Brazilian television series debuts
1992 Brazilian television series endings
1992 telenovelas
TV Globo telenovelas
Brazilian telenovelas
Portuguese-language telenovelas